Mystica is the second and final studio album by the British Gothic metal band The Blood Divine.

Track listing
"Mystica" – 4:18
"As Rapture Fades" – 3:24
"Visions in Blue" – 4:32
"The Passion Reigns" – 2:54
"Leaving Me Helpless" – 3:06
"Visions Part II: Event Horizon" – 2:04  
"I Believe" – 2:43
"Enhanced by Your Touch" – 1:55
"Sensual Ecstasy" – 4:04
"Fear of a Lonely World" – 6:31
"Prayer" – 4:24

Credits
Darren White - Vocals
Paul Ryan - Guitars
Benjamin Ryan - Keyboards
Steve Maloney - Bass
Was Sarginson - Drums, Percussion

1997 albums
The Blood Divine albums